The Old City Cemetery, also known as Linwood Cemetery, is a  cemetery on what is now Linwood Boulevard, in Columbus, Georgia.  It dates from 1828, when the town of Columbus was founded, or before.  It appears in surveyor Edward Lloyd Thomas's original plan for the city.  The cemetery consists mostly of rectangular family plots bordered by iron fences or walls made of brick or granite, accessed by a main east-west corridor and perpendicular lanes.  It includes both simple and elaborate tombstones, some displaying Egyptian Revival or Gothic styles.

The cemetery was given the name "Linwood" in 1894 by city council resolution, probably to honor Columbus author Caroline Lee Hentz whose works include Ernest Linwood, an 1856 book.

It was listed on the National Register of Historic Places in 1980.

According to its 1978 nomination, the majority of prominent Columbus persons are buried there.  Its burials include more than 200 Confederate Army soldiers representing every state in the Confederacy.

Thomas's own son was an early burial, as he died and was buried in the cemetery in 1828 while Thomas was amidst his work surveying, but apparently the grounds include earlier marked and unmarked graves of "'early traders, river people, and Indians.'"

Notable burials 
 James Abercrombie (1792–1861), US Representative
 Henry L. Benning (1814–1875), American Civil War CSA general for whom nearby Fort Benning is named
 Mark Harden Blandford (1826–1902), CSA Congressman
 Absalom Harris Chappell (1801–1878), US Representative
 Peyton H. Colquitt (1831–1863), Civil War Confederate officer
 Walter T. Colquitt (1799–1855), US Senator
 Martin Jenkins Crawford (1820–1883), US Representative and CSA Congressman
 Noble Leslie DeVotie (1838–1861), founder of Sigma Alpha Epsilon Fraternity
 Thomas Flournoy Foster (1796–1848), US Representative

 Hines Holt (1805–1865), US Representative 
 Porter Ingram (1810–1893), CSA Congressman
 Alfred Iverson Sr. (1798–1873), US Representative and Senator
 James Johnson (1811–1891), Georgia Governor
 Seaborn Jones (1788–1864), US Representative

 Thomas M. Nelson (1782–1853), US Representative
 Dr. John Stith Pemberton (1831–1888), formulator of Coca-Cola
 Pleasant J. Philips (1819–1876), Civil War Confederate general
 Paul Jones Semmes (1815–1863), Civil War Confederate general
 Francis Orray Ticknor (1822–1874), doctor and poet

References

External links 

 
 
 
 Historic Linwood Cemetery est. 1828 at Columbus Consolidated Government (CCG) Department of Public Works' Cemetery Division
 Cemetery Records Database at CCG Public Services Department Cemetery Records
 Dolores Autry Linwood Cemetery Collection at Columbus State University Archives

Cemeteries on the National Register of Historic Places in Georgia (U.S. state)
Gothic Revival architecture in Georgia (U.S. state)
1828 establishments in Georgia (U.S. state)
Protected areas of Muscogee County, Georgia
Cemeteries in Georgia (U.S. state)
National Register of Historic Places in Muscogee County, Georgia